Euselenops luniceps is a species of sea slug, a pleurobranchomorph gastropod mollusc in the family Pleurobranchaeidae.

 
 

Euselenops luniceps is the type species of the genus Euselenops and Euselenops luniceps is the only species in the genus Euselenops.

The radula of this species was studied by Thompson & Bebbington (1973), but they did not publish a description or an image of it.

Distribution
This species is widespread in the Indo-West Pacific region.

References

  Cuvier G. (1817) Le règne animal distribué d'après son organisation, pour servir de base à l'histoire naturelle des animaux et d'introduction à l'anatomie comparée. Tome 1, 540 pp.; Tome 2, 528 pp.; Tome 3, 653 pp.; Tome 4, 255 pp., 15 pl. Deterville, Paris.

External links 
 
 

Pleurobranchaeidae
Taxa named by Georges Cuvier